Egernia gillespieae was a species of skink, a lizard in the family Scincidae.

The species was endemic to Northern Australia.

References

Skinks of Australia
Egernia
Endemic fauna of Australia
Reptiles described in 2019